Schwartzia may refer to:
 Schwartzia (plant), a genus of plants in the family Marcgraviaceae
 Schwartzia (bacterium), a genus of bacteria in the family Selenomonadaceae
 Schwartzia, a genus of gastropods in the family Rissoidae, synonym of Rissoa
 Schwartzia, a genus of butterflies in the family Nymphalidae, synonym of Morpho